Stephen Bailey (born 20 June 1986) is an English stand-up comedian and television presenter. He has been the presenter of  Celebs on the Farm since 2018.

Life and career 
Bailey was born on 20 June 1986 in Denton, Greater Manchester, where he was raised. As well as being a comedian, Bailey has presented televisions shows including Celebs on the Farm on 5Star and later MTV and its spin-off Celebs on the Ranch. In 2020, Bailey took over as presenter of Takeshi's Castle on Comedy Central. Bailey is also the narrator of ITVBe's Ferne McCann: First Time Mum. He has appeared on several television shows including Roast Battle, CelebAbility, Love Island: Aftersun, Celebrity Mastermind, The Stand Up Sketch Show, Hey Tracey, Good Morning Britain, Zoe Ball on Saturday/Sunday, Celebrity 5 Go Camping and Richard Osman's House of Games as well as being a regular comedian on Big Brother's Bit on the Side. In 2018, Bailey appeared in two episodes of Coronation Street as M.C, a hairdresser. In 2019, Bailey made his debut on BBC's Live at the Apollo and his first 30-minute comedy special was released on Comedy Central. In 2020, he appeared on E4's Celebrity Coach Trip alongside Brennan Reece. In 2022, he joined Gemma Collins on her theatre tour to present.

Personal life
Bailey is gay. He is a black belt in taekwondo, which he often speaks about in his comedy when talking about breaking down stereotypes. In 2017, Bailey was named one of Attitude magazine's Top 100 Bachelors.

References

External links
 

1986 births
British television presenters
Gay comedians
Living people
People from London